Ellwood is a surname. Notable people with the name include:

Annabel Ellwood (born 1978), Australian tennis player
Sir Aubrey Ellwood (1897–1992), British Royal Air Force commander
Ben Ellwood (born 1976), Australian tennis player
Charles A. Ellwood (1873–1946), American sociologist
Craig Ellwood (1922–1992), American modernist architect
David T. Ellwood (fl. 1970s–2010s), American academic
Doug Ellwood (fl. 1960s), New Zealand rugby league player
Eddy Ellwood (born 1964), British world champion bodybuilder and professional strongman
Fionnuala Ellwood (born 1964), Irish-born actress
Frank Ellwood (born 1935), American football player and coach
Isaac L. Ellwood (1833–1910), American rancher, businessman and barbed wire entrepreneur
Katie Ellwood (fl. 2000s–2020s), British film and television director
Paul M. Ellwood Jr. (1926–2022), American health care organization pioneer
Reuben Ellwood (1821–85), American politician
Richard Ellwood (born 1965), English cricketer	
Thomas Ellwood (1639–1714), English religious writer
Tobias Ellwood (born 1966), British politician